The 1988 Everest World Matchplay was a professional non-ranking snooker tournament that took place between 2 and 10 December 1988 in Brentwood, England.

Established by Barry Hearn, this was the first World Matchplay tournament and was an invitation event for the top twelve players on the provisional ranking list. It was the first snooker event to offer a six-figure prize with the winner of the event sponsored by Everest, the double glazing company, receiving £100,000.
  
Of the 12 players, the top eight seeds received a bye into the quarter finals. Steve Davis won the event, defeating John Parrott 9–5 in the final.

Main draw

Final

References

World Matchplay
World Matchplay
World Matchplay
1988